Brzezina may refer to the following places in Poland:
Brzezina, Milicz County in Lower Silesian Voivodeship (south-west Poland)
Brzezina, Oleśnica County in Lower Silesian Voivodeship (south-west Poland)
Brzezina, Środa Śląska County in Lower Silesian Voivodeship (south-west Poland)
Brzezina, Podlaskie Voivodeship (north-east Poland)
Brzezina, Greater Poland Voivodeship (west-central Poland)
Brzezina, Silesian Voivodeship (south Poland)
Brzezina, Brzeg County in Opole Voivodeship (south-west Poland)
Brzezina, Krapkowice County in Opole Voivodeship (south-west Poland)
Brzezina, Strzelce County in Opole Voivodeship (south-west Poland)
Brzezina, Warmian-Masurian Voivodeship (north Poland)
Brzezina, West Pomeranian Voivodeship (north-west Poland)
 Bzezina, a film by Polish director Andrzej Wajda